Jae-eun, also spelled Jae-un, is a Korean unisex given name. The meaning differs based on the hanja used to write each syllable of the name. There are 26 hanja with the reading  "jae" and 30 hanja with the reading "eun" on the South Korean government's official list of hanja which may be used in given names.

People with this name include:

Jeong Jae-eun (born 1969), South Korean female film director
Yim Kyung-jin (born Yim Jae-eun, 1978), South Korean female badminton player
Jung Jae-eun (taekwondo) (born 1980), South Korean female taekwondo athlete
, South Korean actress who won a Blue Dragon award for her performance in Yellow Hair
O Jae-eun (born 1983), South Korean female alpine skier
Chung Jae-Eun, South Korean ISU Figure Skating technical specialist

See also
List of Korean given names

References

Korean unisex given names